Zoveydi-ye Maghamez (also Romanized as Zoveydī-ye Maghāmez; also known as Zobeydī-ye Maqāmes) is a village in Howmeh-ye Sharqi Rural District, in the Central District of Ramhormoz County, Khuzestan Province, Iran. At the 2006 census, its population was 370, in 76 families.

References 

Populated places in Ramhormoz County